A lame duck situation generally refers to a time frame between a decision and its implementation.

It may also refer to:

Lame duck (politics), an elected official who is approaching the end of his or her tenure, and especially an official whose successor has already been elected
Lame duck session, a legislative session that takes place after an election but before newly elected members are seated
Lame duck (game design), a player in a game who cannot win, yet remains in the game
Lame Ducks (TV series), a British sitcom
Lame Duck Amendment, an informal name for the Twentieth Amendment to the United States Constitution
Lame duck season, in professional sports, a season prior to or during which a team has announced its intent to relocate to another metropolitan area but will remain in its existing home until the next year. Examples include:
1995 Cleveland Browns season, in which the team's reorganization in Baltimore was announced midway through
1996 Houston Oilers season, in which the team's move to Tennessee was announced beforehand
2017 Oakland Raiders season, in which the team's intent to move to Las Vegas was announced before the season and did not occur until after three full seasons in Oakland
Brain Donors, a 1992 film originally titled Lame Ducks

ru:Хромая утка